Maitri Setu (lit. friendship bridge) is a  bridge on Feni River which links Tripura in India with Chittagong port in Bangladesh, thus providing a shorter and more economical alternate land route between India's eastern and western states compared to the longer route through Assam.  On 9 March 2021, it was officially opened to public by the Prime Minister of India, Narendra Modi.

History

In June 2015, the foundation stone for the bridge was officially laid by Indian Prime Minister Narendra Modi and Bangladesh Prime Minister Sheikh Hasina. The cost of constructing the bridge, as well as the approach roads to it in both Bangladesh and India, was borne by India. The NHIDCL was appointed to execute the project. The bridge connects Tripura with the Chittagong port in Bangladesh providing landlocked North East India with access to the sea, and enabling the transport of heavy machines and goods to North East India via Bangladesh. Bridge was constructed by Ahmedabad based Dineshchandra R. Agrawal Infracon Private Limited (DRA Infracon).

The bridge was inaugurated on 9 March 2021 by the Indian Prime Minister Narendra Modi and Bangladesh Prime Minister Sheikh Hasina via video conference. The bridge was named "Maitri Setu" symbolizing the growing friendship and bilateral ties between India and Bangladesh. The construction was taken up by the Government of India at a project cost of ₹133 crores.

Significance 

The bridge place a very important economic role as a major trade route to Northeast India, with access to Chittagong Port, which is just  from the border. Land route between Agartala and Kolkata Port through this bridge is just 450 km via Bangladesh compared to the 1600 km land route via Siliguri Corridor. Logistics cost from Agartala to Kolkata Port will be 80% lower, as compared to the Siliguri Corridor, if the goods are sent through this bridge via Chattogram Port 200 km away.

Future connectivity

A rail link extension to Chittagong Port and Cox's Bazar deep water port in Bangladesh by rehabilitating the railway link from Santir Bazar railway station in India to Feni Junction railway station in Bangladesh is planned which will also provide the strategic redundancy and alternative to Kaladan Multi-Modal project route if there is a war with China.

See also

 Look East policy (India)
 Bangladesh–India relations
 Bangladesh–India border

References

Bangladesh–India relations
Roads in Tripura
Roads in Bangladesh
Bridges in India
Bridges in Bangladesh
Border crossings of India
Border crossings of Bangladesh
Bangladesh–India border crossings